Bigger Than My Imagination is the debut album of contemporary worship musician Michael Gungor.

Track listing 

 "Closest Friend"
 "Friend of God"
 "Bigger Than My Imagination"
 "Move Me"
 "Meet With Me"
 "Waiting"
 "I Am Yours"
 "Little Kingdom"
 "Lovely"
 "Beautiful Face"
 "Here I Am to Worship"
 "It's Your Love"
 "Doxology"
 "Overwhelming"
 "Friend of God" (reprise)

Notes 

 Israel Houghton – producer
 "Bigger Than My Imagination" was later included on the live worship album, Amazing God

References 

2003 debut albums